Mountelgonia is a genus of moths belonging to the family Cossidae, Metarbelidae.

Distribution
The known species of this genus are found in Central & Eastern Africa (Kenya, Burundi, Rwanda, Tanzania and Zambia).

Species
Mountelgonia percivali Lehmann, 2013 (Kenya)
Mountelgonia lumbuaensis Lehmann, 2013 (Kenya)
Mountelgonia arcifera (Hampson, 1909),    (Kenya & Tanzania)
Mountelgonia abercornensis Lehmann, 2013 (Zambia)
Mountelgonia thikaensis Lehmann, 2013  (Kenya)
Mountelgonia pagana  (Strand, 1909)  (Rwanda)
Mountelgonia urundiensis Lehmann, 2013    (Burundi)

References

 
Metarbelinae